The Brunei LNG (BLNG) is the LNG plant in Lumut, Brunei. It is the largest oil and gas producer in the country. Moreover as of 2006, Brunei has been the 4th largest oil producer in Southeast Asia and the 9th largest LNG producer in the world.

History 
The company was officially established in December 1969, with the Government of Brunei, Shell Overseas Holdings and Mitsubishi Corporation signing a Joint Venture (JV) agreement in January 1970. At the same year, the Coldgas Trading Limited and the Tokyo Electric Power Company Inc., Tokyo Gas Co. Ltd. and Osaka Gas Co. Ltd. signed a Sales and Purchase Agreement (SPA) with BLNG. The company was set up after the discover of the offshore Ampa gas field off the Belait District in 1963.

The first LNG plant in the Western Pacific was completed, and the first ship to complete a voyage to Japan were in 1972. In 1993, the LNG underwent a B$500 million renovation for the plant's life extension and again in the same year, the Japanese companies extended the SPA agreement for an additional 20 years. In 1994, a South Korean company also signed a SPA agreement which would be taken into effect after 1997. An estimated of $B1,632 million of LNG was sold to Japan in 1999.

Plans to develop the Egret gas field was officially known in November 2001 and expected to start production in August 2003. The renovation of the LNG plant took place again from 2004 until 2010. In 2007, Japan has imported B$2 billion of both LNG and crude oil from Brunei.

Shareholders 
The operating company—Brunei LNG Sdn Bhd—is owned by the Government of Brunei (50%),  Shell Overseas Trading Limited and Mitsubishi Corporation (both 25%). Brunei LNG operates five LNG trains and produces 6.71 million tonnes every year of liquified natural gas. It has approximately 500 personnel.

The facility uses Air Products' AP-C3MR process and has three LNG storage tanks capable of holding .

Brunei Gas Carriers 

These older ships were built in France (Bebatik/Bekalang/Bekulan/Belais/Belanak/Bilis/Bubuk). Brunei LNG operates seven LNG carriers through the joint venture company, Brunei Shell Tankers (BST). BST was established in 1986.

In 1998, the Brunei Gas Carriers (BSC) was established, and in 2014, the three newer vessels were built in Korea (Amani/Amali/Arkat) and Japan (Abadi) by Daewoo and Mitsubishi Nagasaki respectively. The first of these three ships was delivered in June 2002, with the most recent ship, Amadi, being delivered in July 2011.

References

External links

 Corporate website

Oil and gas companies of Brunei
Natural gas in Brunei
Energy infrastructure in Brunei
Liquefied natural gas plants
Shell plc subsidiaries
Belait District
Non-renewable resource companies established in 1969
1969 establishments in Brunei